The 1882–83 season was the tenth Scottish football season in which Dumbarton competed at a national level.

Scottish Cup

Following two seasons as runners-up, it was 'third time lucky' for Dumbarton in the Scottish Cup where they were at last crowned Scottish champions.  On the road to the final Dumbarton disposed of the holders, Queen's Park in the quarter final and after a 2-2 draw, defeated their old rivals Vale of Leven in the final.

Glasgow Charity Cup

Queen's Park got some revenge for their Scottish Cup exit by beating Dumbarton in the semi final.

Friendlies

During the season, 18 'friendly' matches were played, including home and away fixtures against Vale of Leven, Hearts, Rangers, St Bernards and Cowlairs, a win over Ayrshire Cup holders Kilmarnock Portland, and a north of England 'tour' which took in three matches during the New Year holidays. In all, 13 were won, 2 drawn and 3 lost, scoring 53 goals and conceding 18.

Player statistics

Of note amongst those donning the club's colours for the first time was Robert 'Plumber' Brown.

Only includes appearances and goals in competitive Scottish Cup matches.

Source:

International Caps

An international trial match was played on 3 March 1883 to consider selection of teams to represent Scotland in the upcoming games against England and Wales. Joe Lindsay, James McAulay, William McKinnon and Peter Miller played for the 'Probables' against Robert 'Plumber' Brown, James Miller and Michael Paton for the 'Improbables.  Lindsay scored one of the 'Probables goals in their 4-3 win.

Subsequently, William McKinnon, earned his first and second caps and both James McAulay and Peter Miller earned their second and third caps against England and Wales respectively.  In addition Michael Paton earned his first international cap for Scotland against England.

Representative Matches
Scotch Counties played a trial match against a Glasgow XI on 6 January 1883 to decide on the team to play Lancashire, with Robert 'Sparrow' Brown and William McKinnon playing - the result being a 4-4 draw.
The following week, Brown, McKinnon and Peter Miller played for the 'Counties' against Lancashire - drawing 3-3.

On the same day as the Lancashire match, James McAulay, James Miller and Jock Hutcheson played for Scotch Counties in a trial match against a Glasgow XI, this time to consider the team to play against Birmingham & District.  The result was a 4-0 win with Miller scoring one of the goals.
On 27 January 1883, Jock Hutcheson, James McAulay, William McKinnon, James Miller and Peter Miller all played for the 'Counties' against Birmingham & District - drawing 2-2 with James Miller scoring one of the goals.

Reserve Team
Dumbarton competed in the Scottish Second XI Cup, anxious to repeat their success of the previous season. Reports on these matches are sketchy, no doubt due to the overwhelming local interest in the Scottish Cup progress at the same time, but Dumbarton lost out at the semi final stage to eventual winners Kilmarnock Athletic.

On 3 March 1883 a Dumbartonshire B XI played against a Glasgow B XI to raise funds for the Second Eleven Association. R Lindsay, Tom Veitch, G Galbraith, James Liddell, McIntyre and R Anderson were all selected to play for 'Dumbarton' in a 1-1 draw.

References

External links

Dumbarton F.C. seasons
Scottish football clubs 1882–83 season